This is a list of women artists who were born in the Bahamas or whose artworks are closely associated with that country.

A 
 Janine Antoni (born 1964), Bahamian–born American multidisciplinary artist

G 
 Tamika Galanis, artist, filmmaker, writer, researcher

S 
 Gio Swaby (born 1991), textile artist and designer

See also 
 List of Bahamian artists
 List of Bahamians

-
Bahamian
Artists
Artists, women